Morrilton Municipal Airport  is a public use airport located two nautical miles (4 km) southeast of the central business district of Morrilton, in Conway County, Arkansas, United States. It is owned by the City of Morrilton.

This airport is included in the FAA's National Plan of Integrated Airport Systems for 2011–2015, which categorized it as a general aviation airport.

Although most U.S. airports use the same three-letter location identifier for the FAA and IATA, this airport is assigned BDQ by the FAA but has no designation from the IATA (which assigned BDQ to Vadodara Airport in India).

Facilities and aircraft 
Morrilton Municipal Airport covers an area of 125 acres (51 ha) at an elevation of 321 feet (98 m) above mean sea level. It has one runway designated 9/27 with an asphalt surface measuring 4,000 by 75 feet (1,219 x 23 m).

For the 12-month period ending May 31, 2009, the airport had 7,050 aircraft operations, an average of 19 per day: 93% general aviation and 7% military. At that time there were 43 aircraft based at this airport: 79% single-engine, 5% multi-engine, 12% helicopter and 5% ultralight.

References

External links 
 Morrilton Municipal Airport (BDQ) at Arkansas Department of Aeronautics
 Aerial image as of 30 January 2001 from USGS The National Map
 

Airports in Arkansas
Transportation in Conway County, Arkansas